The Davis Covered Bridge is a historic wooden covered bridge located at Cleveland Township in Columbia County, Pennsylvania. It crosses the North Branch of Roaring Creek. It is one of 28 historic covered bridges in Columbia and Montour  Counties.

It was listed on the National Register of Historic Places in 1979.

References 

Covered bridges on the National Register of Historic Places in Pennsylvania
Covered bridges in Columbia County, Pennsylvania
Bridges completed in 1850
Wooden bridges in Pennsylvania
Bridges in Columbia County, Pennsylvania
National Register of Historic Places in Columbia County, Pennsylvania
Road bridges on the National Register of Historic Places in Pennsylvania
Burr Truss bridges in the United States